Jonathan Hamm (born October 14, 1985) is a former standout amateur boxer, actor, football player, and current mixed martial artist. Hamm was the #1 Super-Heavyweight Amateur boxer in the United States in 2011 after winning the 2011 U.S. Nationals. Hamm was an alternate in the super-heavyweight division of the 2012 London Olympic Games for the U.S. Hamm earned Black College All-American, 1st Team All Conference, 1st Team All-Region, and The Marion E. Jackson Defensive Player of the Year in 2006. Hamm is originally from Atlanta, Georgia, and trained out of Jackson's Submissions Fighting in Albuquerque, New Mexico. His manager was Malki Kawa, founder of First Round Management out of Miami, Florida, who houses UFC stars Jon Jones, Benson Henderson, Carlos Condit, Miesha Tate, and Frank Mir.

Hamm went to Southern Illinois University and received a degree in Music Business. He was mentored by the late Mar Brown VP of the Urban Department of Atlantic Records and music executive John Monopoly. He is the CEO of P4P ("There's a Purpose 4 This Process") Entertainment Records.

Football
Hamm played football for Southern Illinois University and Clark Atlanta University before signing a professional contract with the New Orleans Saints in 2007. Following a hamstring injury, however, Hamm was cut by the Saints and subsequently played for two years for the New York Dragons of the Arena Football League. In 2009, Hamm was a member of the San Angelo Stampede Express of the Indoor Football League.

Acting
Hamm had modeled and appeared in television commercials by 2007, and was discovered by Robert D. Siegel when Siegel was casting for the independent film Big Fan. That film was well received by critics, but Hamm didn't believe that he had a future in acting, and abandoned the profession.

Boxing
Hamm was recruited to become a boxer in 2009 by All-American Heavyweights, an organization that develops athletes from other sports into boxers.  Through All-American Heavyweights Hamm was matched with Johnny Johnson, the proprietor of the Rice Street Gym in St Paul.  Johnson trained Hamm until a motorcycle accident curttailed Johnson's involvement, so Adonis Frazier of Circle of Discipline Boxing Gym in Minneapolis is filling in while Johnson recovers. Hamm draws great comparison to former heavyweight champion Lennox Lewis, with his size, hair and athleticism. His nickname is "Beauty Salon" because of his longhair, long eyelashes, and his ladylike persona. Hamm has a boxing sponsorship with hip-hop mogul 50 Cent's Street King Energy Drink. In 2011 Hamm qualified for the US Olympic Trials by winning the 2011 USA Boxing championship. Hamm currently fights out of Carson, California at the Rock Boxing Gym. He is currently signed with All American Heavyweights Promotions as a professional.

 2011 USA National Champion
 2011 USA Olympic Trials #1 Seed
 2011 National Golden Gloves 3rd Place
 2011 Upper Midwest Golden Glove Champ
 2011 Minnesota Golden Glove Champ
 2011 USA Minnesota District Champ
 2011 USA Upper Midwest Champ
 2010 Coachella Dessert Showdown Champ

References

All-American Heavyweights

External links
The Siac
Boxing.com
News Daily
Boxing.com
 Twitter
 IMDb

Living people
Super-heavyweight boxers
Boxers from Saint Paul, Minnesota
American football defensive linemen
San Angelo Stampede Express players
New York Dragons players
New Orleans Saints players
1985 births
American male boxers
Clark Atlanta Panthers football players
Southern Illinois Salukis football players
Players of American football from Atlanta
Boxers from Atlanta